Life Is Good is the sixth studio album by the Irish-American Celtic punk band Flogging Molly, released on June 2, 2017. Their first studio album in six years (following 2011's Speed of Darkness), it is also their first album to feature drummer Mike Alonso, and their last album with banjo player Bob Schmidt.

Track listing

Reception
Life is Good received a 61 out of 100 score on Metacritic, indicating "generally favorable reviews." In their review, Allmusic commented that "The Hand of John L. Sullivan" is a blazing barn burner in the band's signature tradition, and "Crushed [Hostile Nations]" is a slow-building wartime tale with a massive chorus that harkens back to King's heavy metal past." Classic Rock Magazine also gave the album a mostly positive review and called "The Hand of John L. Sullivan" a highlight.

Personnel 
Flogging Molly
Dave King – lead vocals, acoustic guitar, bodhran, spoons
Bridget Reagan – fiddle, tin whistle, backing vocals
Dennis Casey – acoustic guitar, electric guitar, backing vocals
Matt Hensley – accordion, backing vocals
Nathen Maxwell – bass, lead vocal on "The Days We've Yet to Meet", backing vocals
Bob Schmidt – banjo, mandolin, backing vocals
Mike Alonso – drums, percussion, backing vocals

Guests musicians
Keith Douglas and Brad Magers (Mariachi El Bronx) – trumpet on "Welcome to Adamstown" and "Life is Good"
Neillidh Mulligan – uilleann pipes on "Crushed (Hostile Nations)"

Charts

References 

Flogging Molly albums
2017 albums
Albums produced by Joe Chiccarelli